The 2003 WNBA season was their fifth season and their first in Connecticut. The Sun made the playoffs for the first time since 2000. They would sweep the Charlotte Sting in the first round, only to get swept to the eventual champion Detroit Shock in the conference finals.

Offseason

Dispersal Draft
Based on the Sun's 2002 record, they would pick 6th in the Miami Sol/Portland Fire dispersal draft. The Sun selected point guard Debbie Black.

WNBA Draft

Transactions
September 23: Rebecca Lobo announced her retirement.
May 21: The Sun waived Rasheeda Clark and Lindsey Wilson and announced the retirement of Carla McGhee.
May 10: The Sun waived Brianne Stepherson.
May 7: The Sun waived Natalie Powers.
May 1: The Sun waived Davalyn Cunningham.
February 14: The Sun traded its second round pick in the 2003 WNBA Draft to the Houston Comets in return for Rebecca Lobo.

Roster

Season standings

Schedule

Preseason

Regular season

Playoffs
In the first round of the Eastern Conference Playoffs, the Sun had to face the Charlotte Sting. Since the Sting had the better record, the series would be played with game 1 at Connecticut, game 2 at Charlotte, and game 3 (if needed) at Charlotte. The Sun swept the Sting and advanced to the second round.
In the second round of the Eastern Conference Playoffs, the Sun had to face the Detroit Shock. Since the Shock had the better record, the series would be played with game 1 at Connecticut and games 2 and 3 (if needed) at Detroit. The Shock swept the Sun and game 3 was not needed.

Depth

Player stats
http://www.wnba.com/sun/stats/2003/

Awards and honors
Shannon Johnson and Nykesha Sales were named to the WNBA All-Star team.
Nykesha Sales was given the Off Season Community Assist Award.

References

External links

Connecticut Sun seasons
Connecticut
Connecticut Sun